Achères–Grand-Cormier is a French railway station in Achères, Yvelines département, Île-de-France region.

Location 
The station is at kilometric point 21.250 of Paris-Le Havre railway. It is inside a rail complex that includes a marshalling yard, a depot, and a maintenance establishment. This complex is the starting point of Achères-Pontoise railway. It is also crossed by Grande Ceinture line.

During works on RER line A, Poissy branch is disconnected from the line. Trains serving the station are from line L, extended from Maisons-Laffitte to Poissy.

History 
The original station was a simple stop put in operation on 9 May 1843 by Compagnie du chemin de fer de Paris à Rouen. Il was a hundred meters northern and was named Étoile de Conflans.

After the classification yard extension and Achères-Pontoise railway was put into service, the station was given the name Achères-Embranchement in 1877. A second building was added next to the first in 1882.

During the 1920s, the name of the station became simply Achères. In 1931, level crossings on RN 184 were removed and a double bridge was built. The former station was neglected, and the current building was put in operation.

It was renamed Achères-Grand-Cormier when the Achères-Ville station was put into operation on Achères-Pontoise railway in 1976. A former stop, named Village d'Achères, used to be on this railway, but was destroyed by bombings during the night from 7 to 8 June 1944. It was not put into service again, but platforms are still visible.

In 2009, 330 people a day entered the station.

Service

Facilities 
The station has two central platforms.

Train service 
Achères–Grand-Cormier is served by RER A trains running on A5 branch, ending in Poissy.

Access 
The station is isolated inside the forest of Saint-Germain-en-Laye, on the road from Saint-Germain-en-Laye to Pontoise. Pedestrian access is on national route 184. At night, it is served by Noctilien bus line 152.

Freight 
Freight is assumed by Achères-Triage station.

References

External links 
 

Réseau Express Régional stations
Railway stations in France opened in 1989
Railway stations in Yvelines